Timothy Skinner House is a historic home located at Mexico in Oswego County, New York.  It is a large, Italianate style brick residence.  The residence was built about 1869 and is composed of a -story, three-bay main block with a 2-story, two-bay recessed wing.  The property was sold to the American Legion in 1964.

It was listed on the National Register of Historic Places in 1991.

References

Houses on the National Register of Historic Places in New York (state)
Italianate architecture in New York (state)
Houses completed in 1869
Houses in Oswego County, New York
1869 establishments in New York (state)
National Register of Historic Places in Oswego County, New York